NGC 182 is a spiral galaxy with a ring structure, located in the constellation Pisces. It was discovered on December 25, 1790 by William Herschel.

In 2004 a type IIb supernova was discovered in this galaxy and designated SN 2004ex.

References

External links
 

0182
Intermediate spiral galaxies
Discoveries by William Herschel
Pisces (constellation)
002279